Maja and Reuben Fowkes are London-based curators, critics and art historians specialised in East European art history and contemporary art and ecology.

They are authors of Central and Eastern European Art Since 1950 (World of Art), published by Thames & Hudson in March 2020, the "first ever comprehensive, transnational survey of the major movements and practitioners of recent art from Central and Eastern Europe."

They are co-directors of the Translocal Institute for Contemporary Art, a centre for transnational research into East European art and ecology that operates across the disciplinary boundaries of art history, contemporary art and ecological thought.

They head the Post-socialist Art Centre (PACT) at the Institute of Advanced Studies, University College London.

They are founding members of the Environmental Arts and Humanities Initiative (EAH) at Central European University.

Art and ecology 

Their extensive publications in the field of art and ecology are archived on Translocal Institute.

They have curated symposia and artist talks at the Institute of Advanced Studies, UCL, including on the Biopolitics of the Plasticene exploring artistic interventions in a plasticised world, and a discussion event on the Turbulent Geohistories of Sugar.

They are curators of the Experimental Reading Room, designed to create a space to interact, experiment, learn and dream our way to a new orientation towards ecological awareness in contemporary art and society and has been held  in venues in Budapest, Vienna, Glasgow, Miami and London.

Their Danube River School brought together artists, writers, environmental historians and anthropologists for a series of symposiums, exhibitions and excursions into wilderness and resulted in the publication River Ecologies: Contemporary Art and Environmental Humanities on the Danube (2015).

Their work within the field of environmental art history has included a chapter entitled 'Cracks in the Planet: Geo-ecological Matter in East European Art,' in Extending the Dialogue and an article on 'The Primeval Cosmic River and its Ecological Realities: On the curatorial project Danube River School (2013-2015),' in the journal Geohumanities.

Interviews about their recent publications and work on the issue of art in the Anthropocene appeared on Mezosfera and the Anthropocene Index.

Their contribution to the edited volume Curating Subjects III – Curating Research (2014) was a chapter on ‘Renewing the Curatorial Refrain: Sustainable Research in Contemporary Art.’

Their Danube River School project between 2013 and 2015 brought together artists, writers, environmental historians and anthropologists for a series of symposiums, exhibitions and excursions into wilderness and resulted in the publication River Ecologies: Contemporary Art and Environmental Humanities on the Danube (2015),

They are contributors to the Post-Human Glossary (2016).

They have lectured widely on art and ecology including at Modern Art Oxford, Aarhus Kunstbygning, De Appel, Pav Turino, Bratislava Art Academy, MIT, and Museum Sztuki Lodz.

East European art 
A major focus of their work is on researching East European art since 1945 and contemporary East European art.

They are co-directors of the Getty Foundation Connecting Art Histories funded international programme Confrontations: Sessions in East European Art History based at the Post-socialist Art Centre (PACT, UCL.

They are co-authors of the Thames & Hudson World of Art series book on Central and Eastern European Art Since 1950, the first of its kind to survey the art of the region from the Second World War till today.

Maja Fowkes is the author of The Green Bloc: Neo-avant-garde Art and Ecology under Socialism (2015).

Their publications on East European art include two special issues of Third Text, the first on 'Socialist Eastern Europe' (2009), the second on ‘Actually Existing Artworlds under Socialism’ (2018).

Their performative lecture Points East: An Artworld, a City and a Continent in Transformation, held at the Centre for Contemporary Art (CCA) Glasgow in November 2019 restaged a seminal meeting of critics, artists and art historians at Glasgow’s Third Eye Centre in December 1990.

Their article 'Placing Bookmarks: The Institutionalisation and De-Institutionalisation of Hungarian Neo-Avant-Garde and Contemporary Art' on the role of collectors, global museums and art historians in forming art historical narratives appeared in Tate Papers in 2016.

They have lectured widely on East European art, including at: College Art Association annual conference, Washington 2016, MoMA New York within the framework of the C-MAP programme (2016), KUMU Art Museum Tallinn (2015), CSW Zamek Ujazdowski, Warsaw (2015), Former West conference, BAK Utrecht (2014), AICA 46th International Congress, Kosice and Bratislava (2013) and the Clark Institute conference on 'Art History on the Disciplinary Map in East-Central Europe' (2010).

A video interview with Maja and Reuben Fowkes appeared on the MoMA online platform Posts: Notes on Modern and Contemporary Art around the World in 2016.

Exhibitions 
Their curated exhibitions include Revolution is not a Garden Party, which dealt with the legacy of the 1956 Revolution for contemporary art and was held at Trafo Gallery Budapest, Norwich Gallery and Galerija Miroslav Kraljevic in Zagreb in 2006-7. The second part of their revolution trilogy is Revolution I Love You: 1968 in Art, Politics and Philosophy which was shown at the Centre for Contemporary Art Thessaloniki in summer 2008, as well as Trafo Gallery Budapest and International Project Space Birmingham. Revolutionary Decadence: Foreign Artists in Budapest since 1989 completed the trilogy and was shown at Kiscell Museum Budapest in November 2009.

In 2010 and 2011 they curated the exhibition Loophole to Happiness that explored the freedom-enhancing loopholes that exist on the margins of social systems from East European communism to global capitalism, taking the inventive strategies of worker resistance under socialism as the starting point for contemporary attempts to imagine exceptions and find escape routes from today’s neo-liberal capitalist order. Held at Trafo Gallery Budapest, Museum Sztuki Lodz, Futura Centre for Contemporary Art Prague and AMT Project Bratislava, the exhibition also resulted in a samizdat publication.

Their exhibition Like a Bird: Avian Ecologies in Contemporary Art examined complex questions around the changing human relationship to the natural world, the channelling of environmental awareness and its political dimensions and was shown at Trafo Gallery Budapest and tranzit.ro in Bucharest in 2014.

The group show #underthestars at Knoll Gallery Vienna in 2014 was realised as part of Curated_By_Vienna and investigated ecological alternatives to the tragic figure of the immaterial worker who spends too much time in bed, replying to emails, creating social media clips, interacting virtually, but not going anywhere.

In 2014 and 2015 they curated the solo exhibitions of Csaba Nemes at Museum of Modern and Contemporary Art in Rijeka, and MOCAK, Krakow.

In 2015-6 their exhibition ‘Walking without Footprints’ was held at tranzit.sk in Bratislava, addressing walking as a strategy to rethink our relationship to the natural environment.

See also 
Sustainable art
Ecological art
Contemporary art
Art history
Ecological humanities

References

External links 
 Translocal Institute for Contemporary Art
 Postsocialist Art Centre (PACT), University College London

British art curators